Çeşməli is a village and municipality in the Shaki City Territorial unit of Azerbaijan. It has a population of 465.

References

Populated places in Shaki District